Diesel and Dust is the sixth studio album by Australian rock band Midnight Oil, released in August 1987 by SPRINT Music label under Columbia Records. Diesel and Dust was produced by Warne Livesey and the band. It is a concept album about the struggles of Indigenous Australians and environmental causes, issues important to the band. It drew inspiration from the Blackfella/Whitefella Tour of remote Indigenous communities with the Warumpi Band and Gondwanaland in 1986. The album peaked at No. 1 on the Australian Kent Music Report Albums Chart for six weeks.

Diesel and Dust has been critically lauded since its release. Rolling Stone editors named it the best album of 1988 (the year of its United States release), and later ranked it the 13th greatest record of the 1980s. In October 2010, Diesel and Dust was listed at no.1 in the book, 100 Best Australian Albums. In December of 2021, the album was listed at no. 5 in Rolling Stone Australia’s ‘200 Greatest Albums of All Time’ countdown.

Background
Midnight Oil spent several months in mid-1986 on the Blackfella/Whitefella Tour of outback Australia with indigenous music groups Warumpi Band and Gondwanaland, playing to remote Aboriginal communities and seeing first hand the seriousness of the issues in health and living standards. The tour was criticised by some journalists for being a one-off event instead of a long-term attempt to build bridges between communities. The band was galvanised by the experiences and made them the basis of their next album, Diesel and Dust, which was released in August 1987 and produced by Warne Livesey and the band. The album focused on the need for recognition by white Australia of past injustices involving the Aboriginal nation and the need for reconciliation. Peter Gifford left the band before the album's release due to extensive touring schedules, and was replaced on bass guitar by Bones Hillman, formerly of The Swingers. The track "Gunbarrel Highway" was not included on the United States version of the album, reportedly, because the line "shit falls like rain on a world that is brown" was deemed too offensive for US audiences.

Diesel and Dust peaked at No. 1 on the Australian albums charts for six weeks, No. 21 on the US Billboard 200 in 1988, and No. 19 on the UK Albums Chart. "Beds Are Burning" was their biggest international hit single, peaking at No. 6 in Australia, No. 17 on the US Billboard Hot 100 and No. 6 on the UK Singles Chart. "The Dead Heart" peaked at No. 4 in Australia, and charted on the Hot 100 and in the UK. "Put Down that Weapon" also charted in Australia, while "Dreamworld" charted on Billboard'''s Mainstream Rock Tracks and at No. 16 on its Modern Rock Tracks.

At the Australian Recording Industry Association (ARIA) 1988 Awards ceremony, Midnight Oil won "Best Cover Art" for Diesel and Dust. The album cover was designed by photographer Ken Duncan (b.1954, Mildura, VIC) and visual artist Wart (also known as Jen Waterhouse) (b.1958, Geelong, VIC). It also won "Best Single" and "Best Song" for "Beds Are Burning". A fracas developed between Gary Morris, their manager who was accepting awards for Midnight Oil, and former Countdown compere Ian Meldrum who was presenting: Meldrum objected to Morris making political commentary from the podium.

There were concerns about Diesel and Dust and Midnight Oil's attempts to express indigenous issues to white urban audiences – namely, the question "who holds the power to tell whose history?" The lyrics of "The Dead Heart" tell the story of colonisation from an indigenous point of view, but some critics felt they reinforced the "primitive" stereotype. Use of the bullroarer was criticised as belonging to sacred rituals, and therefore not appropriate for rock songs. "The Dead Heart" had been written in response to a request by organisers of the 1985 ceremony to return control of Uluru to its indigenous caretakers; Midnight Oil originally resisted being added to a concert bill that they believed should contain indigenous groups, but the organisers insisted, arguing that the band would reach a wider audience within the predominantly Caucasian urban centres. Midnight Oil requested that all royalties from the song go to indigenous communities. In addition, two indigenous groups, Warumpi Band and Gondwanaland, toured with them.

Following the 1988 American tour in support of Diesel and Dust with Australian band Yothu Yindi, Midnight Oil launched the Burning Bridges album with various artists contributing, including Paul Kelly, Scrap Metal, Coloured Stone, Hunters & Collectors, James Reyne, The Saints, Crowded House, and INXS. All sales proceeds were donated to the National Coalition of Aboriginal Organisations.

During 1989 to 1993 and 1998 to 2002, Peter Garrett, the band's lead singer, was the President of the Australian Conservation Foundation, whilst during 1993 to 1998 he was on the International Board of Greenpeace. In 1990 Midnight Oil played an impromptu lunchtime set in front of Exxon headquarters in New York with a banner reading, "Midnight Oil Makes You Dance, Exxon Oil Makes Us Sick," protesting the Exxon Valdez oil spill the previous year.

"Arctic World" was written by Jim Moginie and Peter Garrett and runs for 4 minutes, 21 seconds. The song is about mining and oil drilling in Greenland and Alaska, and was meant to bring attention to the harmful effects these activities have on the environment.Midnight Oil#International success and activism: 1985–2002

Reception

According to Australian rock music historian Ian McFarlane, Midnight Oil "reached the peak of its powers with the release of the groundbreaking Diesel and Dust''... [it] is arguably one of the greatest Australian albums of all time. Powerful, dynamic and passionate songs like 'Beds are Burning', 'Put Down that Weapon', 'Dreamworld', 'The Dead Heart' and 'Sell My Soul' were statements of intent and a call to action backed by the strength of their convictions". Mark Deming of AllMusic called the record "an artistic success and a triumph for leftist politics" which "makes clear that the bandmembers could apply their intelligence and passion to less aggressive material and still come up with forceful, compelling music".

Track listing

Charts

Weekly charts

Year-end charts

Certifications

Personnel
Midnight Oil
 Peter Garrett – lead vocals and backing vocals
 Peter Gifford – bass and backing vocals
 Robert Hirst – drums, drum machine and backing vocals
 Jim Moginie – guitars, synthesizers, backing vocals and string arrangements
 Martin Rotsey – guitars

Additional musicians
 Glad Reed - trombone
 John Ockwell - cello
 Jeremy Smith - French horn

Production
 Midnight Oil - production
 Warne Livesey - production, additional keyboards
 Guy Gray - engineering
 Greg Henderson - engineering  (6)
 Gary Morris - management (credited as "facilitator")

References

External links
 Midnight Oil

1987 albums
Midnight Oil albums
Columbia Records albums
Sprint Music albums
Albums produced by Warne Livesey
ARIA Award-winning albums
Concept albums